Journal of Applied Ecology is a monthly peer-reviewed scientific journal publishing research in all areas of environmental management. It was established in 1964 and is published by Wiley on behalf of the British Ecological Society. The Senior Editors are Jos Barlow (Executive Editor), Nathalie Pettorelli, Philip Stephens, Martin Nuñez and Romina Rader.

Types of papers published
The journal publishes the following types of papers:
 Research Articles
 Reviews
 Commentaries
 Forums - short contributions intended to stimulate debate
 Policy Directions - discussing policy
 Practitioner's Perspectives - application of research results to environmental management

Southwood Prize
The British Ecological Society awards an annual prize to the best paper from the previous year by an early career researcher in each of the Society’s journals. Journal of Applied Ecology awards the Southwood Prize.

See also
 Journal of Ecology
 Journal of Animal Ecology
 Functional Ecology
 Methods in Ecology and Evolution

References

External links
 

Ecology journals
Wiley-Blackwell academic journals
British Ecological Society academic journals
Publications established in 1964
English-language journals
Bimonthly journals